Wilful Disregard – A Novel About Love  is the sixth novel by Swedish author Lena Andersson, published in 2013. 

The book was released in the UK in June 2015.

It won the August Prize in 2013 and in the same year the Literature Prize given by the Swedish newspaper Svenska Dagbladet.

Plot
The book tells the story about a writer called Ester Nilsson. She meets an artist called Hugo Rask in an unusual way – because he is listening in the audience when she delivers a talk about him. Despite being in a steady relationship, the story tells the story of Nilsson's relationship with Rask, and betrayal.

Reception
In an interview in Fokus on October 31, 2014, Swedish director Roy Andersson claimed he was the inspiration for Hugo Rask.

References

2013 Swedish novels
Swedish-language novels
August Prize-winning works
Novels set in Stockholm
Picador (imprint) books
Natur & Kultur books